Crocodylomorpha is a group of pseudosuchian archosaurs that includes the crocodilians and their extinct relatives. They were the only members of Pseudosuchia to survive the end-Triassic extinction.

During Mesozoic and early Cenozoic times, crocodylomorphs were far more diverse than they are now. Triassic forms were small, lightly built, active terrestrial animals. The earliest and most primitive crocodylomorphs are represented by "sphenosuchians", a paraphyletic assemblage containing small-bodied forms with elongated limbs that walked upright, which represents the ancestral morphology of Crocodylomorpha. These forms persisted until the end of the Jurassic. During the Jurassic, Crocodylomorphs morphologically diversified into numerous niches, with the subgroups Neosuchia (which includes modern crocodilians) and the extinct Thalattosuchia adapting to aquatic life.

Evolutionary history 

When their extinct species and stem group are examined, the crocodylian lineage (clade Pseudosuchia, formerly Crurotarsi) proves to have been a very diverse and adaptive group of reptiles. Not only are they an ancient group of animals – at least as old as the dinosaurs – they also evolved into a great variety of forms and sizes.

The earliest forms, the sphenosuchians, evolved during the Late Triassic, and were highly gracile terrestrial forms built like greyhounds. During the Jurassic and the Cretaceous, marine forms in the family Metriorhynchidae, such as Metriorhynchus, evolved forelimbs that were paddle-like and had a tail similar to modern fish. Dakosaurus andiniensis, a species closely related to Metriorhynchus, had a skull that was adapted to eat large marine reptiles. Several terrestrial species during the Cretaceous were herbivorous, such as Simosuchus clarki and Chimaerasuchus paradoxus. A number of lineages during the Cenozoic became wholly terrestrial predators.

Taxonomy and phylogeny
Historically, all known living and extinct crocodiles were indiscriminately lumped into the order Crocodilia. However, beginning in the late 1980s, many scientists began restricting the order Crocodilia to the living species and close extinct relatives such as Mekosuchus. The various other groups that had previously been known as Crocodilia were moved to Crocodylomorpha and the slightly more restrictive Crocodyliformes. Crocodylomorpha has been given the rank of superorder in some 20th and 21st century studies.

The old Crocodilia was subdivided into the suborders:
 Eusuchia: true crocodiles (which includes crown-group Crocodylia)
 Mesosuchia: 'middle' crocodiles
 Thalattosuchia: sea crocodiles
 Protosuchia: first crocodiles

Mesosuchia is a paraphyletic group as it does not include eusuchians (which nest within Mesosuchia). Mesoeucrocodylia was the name given to the clade that contains mesosuchians and eusuchians (Whetstone and Whybrow, 1983).

Phylogeny
Below is a cladogram modified from Nesbitt (2011) and Bronzati (2012).

The previous definitions of Crocodilia and Eusuchia did not accurately convey evolutionary relationships within the group. The only order-level taxon that is currently considered valid is Crocodilia in its present definition. Prehistoric crocodiles are represented by many taxa, but since few major groups of the ancient forms are distinguishable, a conclusion on how to define new order-level clades is not yet possible. (Benson & Clark, 1988).

Biology
The Crocodylomorpha comprise a variety of forms, shapes, and sizes, which occupied a range of habitats. As with most amniotes, Crocodylomorphs were and are oviparous, laying eggs in a nest or mound, known from strata as old as the Late Jurassic.
Adult size varies widely, from about 55 cm long in Knoetschkesuchus to much larger dimensions, as in Sarcosuchus. Most crocodylomorphs were carnivores, but many lineages evolved to be obligate piscivores, such as the extant gharials.

References

Sources
 Benton, M. J. (2004), Vertebrate Palaeontology, 3rd ed. Blackwell Science Ltd
 Hay, O. P. 1930 (1929–1930). Second Bibliography and Catalogue of the Fossil Vertebrata of North America. Carnegie Institution Publications, Washington, 1, 990 pp.

External links
 Crocodylomorpha - webpages by Ross Elgin on the University of Bristol server
 Major subgroups classification (used here)
 Crocodylomorpha from Palaeos
 Technical definition

 01
Chordate superorders
Extant Late Triassic first appearances
Norian first appearances